Mirabad (also Romanized as Mīrābād; also known as Kalāteh Mīrābād and Kalāteh-ye Mīrābād) is a village in Arabkhaneh Rural District, Shusef District, Nehbandan County, South Khorasan Province, Iran. At the 2006 census, its population was 27, in 7 families.

References 

Populated places in Nehbandan County